The First Reformed Dutch Church of Bergen Neck, now known as The First Federated Church of Bayonne is located in Bayonne, Hudson County, New Jersey, United States. The church was added to the National Register of Historic Places on April 22, 1982.

History
The congregation was established in 1828 and the first church building dedicated on January 11, 1829. The current church was built in 1866 and enlarged in 1890. The building is an example of a bracketed, Italianate-influenced frame church.

See also
Bergen Neck
National Register of Historic Places listings in Hudson County, New Jersey
Old Bergen Church

References

External links

 View of First Reformed Dutch Church of Bergen Neck via Google Street View

Churches in Hudson County, New Jersey
Churches completed in 1866
Federated congregations in the United States
Churches on the National Register of Historic Places in New Jersey
Presbyterian churches in New Jersey
19th-century Reformed Church in America church buildings
Italianate architecture in New Jersey
National Register of Historic Places in Hudson County, New Jersey
1828 establishments in New Jersey
New Jersey Register of Historic Places
Reformed Church in America churches in New Jersey
Italianate church buildings in the United States
Churches in Bayonne, New Jersey